Chino Hills (Chino, Spanish for "Curly") is a city located in the southwestern corner of San Bernardino County, California, United States. The city borders Los Angeles County on its northwest side, Orange County to its south and southwest, and Riverside County to its southeast.

History

Indigenous
Prior to the colonization of the area by the Spanish Empire in the late 18th century, the Tongva village of Wapijanga was the major point of influence in what would become referred to as Chino Hills. The village was an important point of connection between the Tongva and Serrano.

Spanish and Mexican eras
After the Spanish founded Mission San Gabriel in 1771, the Chino Hills region was used extensively for grazing by mission cattle. During the Mexican Republic era, the hills were used as spillover grazing from such surrounding Mexican ranchos as Santa Ana del Chino and Rancho La Sierra (Yorba).

Early American era
This land was sold to Richard Gird, the founder of nearby Chino subdivision and from which the town of Chino sprung in 1910. With the building of the Carbon Canyon Mineral Springs in the modern-day Sleepy Hollow region of the city and the new Los Serranos Country Club in Los Serranos, Chino Hills, California, the area became a destination for both Los Angeles tourists and bootleggers during the prohibition because of its isolation. For the same reason, Sleepy Hollow became a destination for hippies and artists during the 1960s. During the late 1980s, an incorporation effort began and in 1991, the city was incorporated with a population of 42,000.

Development
Due to its topography of rolling hills, Chino Hills was primarily rural prior to the mid-1970s; most land was utilized for equestrian purposes and for dairies, except for the multi-use purposes of the State of California, promoting jobs for the community through day labor from the Chino Institute for Men on Central Avenue. Rapid and extensive housing developments followed throughout the 1980s and early 1990s, only slowing down in recent years. Most neighborhoods are arranged in a village-type format with strategically placed shopping centers and parks designed to be within walking distance of nearby homes.

Chino Hills is home to the Vellano Country Club, a private golf course and housing development designed by golf champion Greg Norman, his first project in the Greater Los Angeles area.

Chino Hills also includes the developed golf course development neighborhood of Los Serranos. Other large master-planned subdivisions without amenities include Woodview/Village Crossing, Gordon Ranch, LaBand Village, Butterfield Ranch, Rolling Ridge, Fairfield Ranch, and Payne Ranch.

Contemporary era

On July 29, the 2008 Chino Hills earthquake, a 5.4 magnitude earthquake, occurred at approximately 11:42:15 am PDT (18:42:15 UTC). Some incidents of damage were reported, but no fatalities or severe injuries occurred as a result. The earthquake was felt as far south as San Diego and as far north as Las Vegas. The quake was reported to have interrupted a taping of the show Judge Judy, as well as a first-day taping of the new show Judge Penny. The epicenter was located in the southeast portion of the Yorba Linda Fault.

Geography

Physical geography
Chino Hills is a part of the Chino Valley.

City layout
The city of Chino Hills is bounded by the Los Angeles County cities of Pomona and Diamond Bar to the north and to the northwest, the Los Angeles County unincorporated area of South Diamond Bar to the west, the San Bernardino County city of Chino to the east, unincorporated Riverside County near Corona to the southeast, and the Orange County cities of Brea and Yorba Linda to the west and southwest, respectively, as well as an unincorporated area of Orange County between Brea and Yorba Linda and a small unincorporated area between Yorba Linda and Anaheim, to the southwest and south, respectively.

The eastern border of Chino Hills roughly follows the Chino Valley Freeway (SR 71), which offers access to the Pomona Freeway (SR 60) to the north and the Riverside Freeway (SR 91) to the south. Undeveloped hills form the western border, which also serves as the San Bernardino – Orange County line. Because this area is mostly undeveloped, there is only one road directly connecting Chino Hills and Orange County, Carbon Canyon Road (SR 142), which is long, winding, and prone to landslides.

Demographics

2010
The 2010 United States Census reported that Chino Hills had a population of 74,799. The racial makeup of Chino Hills was 38,035 (50.8%) White (33.4% Non-Hispanic White), 3,415 (4.6%) African American, 379 (0.5%) Native American, 22,676 (30.3%) Asian, 115 (0.2%) Pacific Islander, 6,520 (8.7%) from other races, and 3,659 (4.9%) from two or more races. Hispanic or Latino of any race were 21,802 persons (29.1%).

The Census reported that 74,644 people (99.8% of the population) lived in households, 8 (0%) lived in non-institutionalized group quarters, and 147 (0.2%) were institutionalized.

There were 22,941 households, out of which 11,026 (48.1%) had children under the age of 18 living in them, 15,840 (69.0%) were opposite-sex married couples living together, 2,381 (10.4%) had a female householder with no husband present, 1,101 (4.8%) had a male householder with no wife present. There were 834 (3.6%) unmarried opposite-sex partnerships, and 142 (0.6%) same-sex married couples or partnerships. 2,713 households (11.8%) were made up of individuals, and 717 (3.1%) had someone living alone who was 65 years of age or older. The average household size was 3.25. There were 19,322 families (84.2% of all households); the average family size was 3.54.

The population was spread out, with 20,291 people (27.1%) under the age of 18, 7,147 people (9.6%) aged 18 to 24, 20,207 people (27.0%) aged 25 to 44, 21,889 people (29.3%) aged 45 to 64, and 5,265 people (7.0%) who were 65 years of age or older. The median age was 36.6 years. For every 100 females, there were 97.7 males. For every 100 females age 18 and over, there were 94.7 males.

The homeowner vacancy rate was 1.0%; the rental vacancy rate was 5.4%. 61,152 people (81.8% of the population) lived in owner-occupied housing units and 13,492 people (18.0%) lived in rental housing units. The median household income was $106,099 and the mean household income was $122,788. For families, the median income was $109,106 and the mean was $127,755.

2000
As of the census of 2000, there were 66,787 people, 20,039 households, and 17,073 families residing in the city. The population density was 575.5/km (1,490.6/mi2). There were 20,414 housing units at an average density of 175.9/km (455.6/mi2). The racial makeup of the city was 56.4% White, 5.5% African American, 0.6% Native American, 22.1% Asian, 0.1% Pacific Islander, 10.6% from other races, and 4.7% from two or more races. 25.7% of the population were Hispanic or Latino of any race. The average house cost was $654,250.

There were 20,039 households, out of which 53.8% had children under the age of 18 living with them, 72.6% were married couples living together, 8.5% had a female householder with no husband present, and 14.8% were non-families. 10.8% of all households were made up of individuals, and 1.6% had someone living alone who was 65 years of age or older. The average household size was 3.33 and the average family size was 3.61. The average home price (excluding the unincorporated area of Los Serranos) was approximately $716,900, and the median home price was $659,900.

In the city, the population was spread out, with 32.9% under the age of 18, 7.4% from 18 to 24, 35.6% from 25 to 44, 19.9% from 45 to 64, and 4.2% who were 65 years of age or older. The median age was 32 years. For every 100 females, there were 98.9 males. For every 100 females age 18 and over, there were 95.1 males.

The median income for a household in the city was $83,550, and the median income for a family was $81,794. Males had a median income of $55,272 versus $38,620 for females. The per capita income for the city was $26,182. The average income for the city was $95,990. 4.1% of the population and 2.7% of families were below the poverty line. Out of the total population, 4.7% of those under the age of 18 and 3.9% of those 65 and older were living below the poverty line.

Political affiliation 
Chino Hills reliably supports the Democratic Party, though by smaller margins compared to other regions such as the more-northerly Pomona. Chino Hills' most pro-Republican areas are in the southern and eastern regions.

Economy

Top employers
According to the city's 2020 Comprehensive Annual Financial Report, the top employers in the city are:

Arts and culture

Library
The Chino Hills Library is a branch of the San Bernardino County Library System. The current library opened in 2009 and is part of the government center on City Center Drive, adjacent to The Shoppes shopping center and Boys Republic.

In film
The area was the fictionalized location of the initial Martian spacecraft's landing in 1953's The War of the Worlds. In the film, Pastor Collins, a resident of nearby Corona, California, refers to the meteor as having landed "halfway to Pomona". Subsequent geographical references by Colonel Heffner indicate the landing place as somewhere near "Carbon Canyon".

Parks and recreation
The city of Chino Hills has several municipal parks. One such example is Overlook Park, which spans   and features scenic views of the Pomona Valley, Chino Hills, and San Gabriel Mountains. It has picnic tables, barbecue grills, and a seating area.

Government

Local
Chino Hills follows the Council-Manager model of government. The city is governed by a city council which establishes all city ordinances, approves plans, adopts budgets, etc. The council appoints the city manager who enforces laws and, in essence, runs the city's day-to-day operations.

City council
The city council is elected by city residents and, within the council, rotates the position of mayor. Once elected, the city council members serve a four-year term. The five city council members meet on the second and fourth Tuesday of each month, with opportunity for residents to voice their opinion during the open forum. The meetings are broadcast via the city's television station and streaming via the city's website.

The current mayor and council members are:
 Mayor: Peter J. Rogers
 Vice mayor: Cynthia Moran
 Council Members: Art Bennett, Brian Johsz, and Ray Marquez

List of mayors 
The City Council selects one member to serve as Mayor for a one-year term. This is a list of Chino Hills mayors by year.
 2009 Peter Rogers
 2012 Art Bennett
 2013 Peter Rogers
 2015 Cynthia Moran
 2016 Art Bennett
 2017 Ray Marquez
 2018 Peter Rogers
 2019 Cynthia Moran
 2020 Art Bennett
 2022 Peter Rogers

State and federal representation
In the state legislature following the 2020 elections, Chino Hills is located in the 29th Senate District, represented by Democrat Josh Newman (politician), and in the 55th Assembly District, represented by Republican Phillip Chen.

Education
Chino Hills is served by the Chino Valley Unified School District.

Elementary schools

 Hidden Trails
 Country Springs
 Eagle Canyon
 Oak Ridge
 Butterfield Ranch
 Michael G. Wickman
 Chaparral
 Gerald F. Litel
 Glenmeade
 Rolling Ridge
Edwin Rhodes

Junior high schools
 Canyon Hills Junior High
 Robert O. Townsend Junior High

High schools
 Ruben S. Ayala High School
 Chino Hills High School
 Boys Republic - a treatment center for boys ages 12 to 18

Independent schools
 Loving Savior of the Hills
 Chino Hills Christian School
 Chino Hills Montessori School

Charter schools
 Mirus Secondary School
 Sycamore Academy of Science and Cultural Arts

Infrastructure

Police and fire
Law enforcement services in Chino Hills are provided by the San Bernardino County Sheriff's Department. The Chief of Police is Sheriff’s Captain Garth Goodell. Chino Hills has contracted with the sheriff's department for law enforcement services since its incorporation in 1991.

The city contracts with the Chino Valley Independent Fire District (CVIFD) for fire protection services. The CVIFD serves the Chino Valley, serving Chino Hills and the city of Chino. The CVIFD is a separate political entity from either Chino Hills or Chino and is managed by its own elected board. The department has three stations located throughout Chino Hills.

Transportation

Local highways
 State Route 60
 State Route 71
 State Route 91
 State Route 142

Public transportation
Chino Hills is served by Omnitrans' OmniLink demand-response service open to the general public. For $2.50 each way, one can travel throughout the city and transfer for free to the Omnitrans public bus at the Chino Hills Marketplace and the Chino Hills Civic Center. The dial-a-ride service operates five days a week, mostly during daytime hours.

Notable people 
 
 A Static Lullaby, major label-signed post-hardcore band
 A Thorn for Every Heart, major label-signed post-hardcore band
 LaMelo Ball, point guard for the Charlotte Hornets
 Lavar Ball, American businessman and former professional football player
 LiAngelo Ball, basketball player
 Lonzo Ball, point guard for the Chicago Bulls, drafted by the Los Angeles Lakers in the 2017 NBA Draft as the Number 2 overall pick after playing his freshmen year of college basketball for UCLA
 Cory Harkey, Los Angeles Rams tight end
 Mike Harkey, former Major League pitcher and pitching coach, 1987 first-round draft pick Chicago Cubs
 Danny Lopez, Hall of Fame boxer
 Steve McQueen (1930–80), actor, spent some of his teen years at Boys Republic High School
 Ricky Minor, American Idol music director
 Mat Mladin, AMA Superbike champion
 Tracy Murray, retired NBA Champion
 Leah O'Brien-Amico, U.S. Olympic softball group gold medalist
 Tony Pedregon, NHRA Funny Car champion
 Rafael Pérez, former Los Angeles Police Department officer, convicted in relation to the Rampart scandal 
 Mike Randolph, Los Angeles Galaxy soccer player
 Ron Roenicke, MLB player and manager
 Jaclyn Swedberg, Playboy Playmate of the Month for April 2011
 Brianne Tju, actress
 Kwame Watson-Siriboe, Real Salt Lake City soccer player
 Tyler Wilson, soccer player
 Del Worsham, NHRA Top Fuel dragster driver

See also 

 BAPS Shri Swaminarayan Mandir Chino Hills

References

External links

 
 

 
Chino Hills (California)
Cities in San Bernardino County, California
Incorporated cities and towns in California
Pomona Valley
Populated places in San Bernardino County, California